Banarasi Babu is a 1997 Indian Hindi comedy film directed by David Dhawan. The film stars Govinda, Ramya, Kader Khan, Shakti Kapoor and Bindu. The film was inspired by William Shakespeare's The Taming of the Shrew and the 1972 Tamil movie Pattikada Pattanama.

Plot

Gopi (Govinda) is a simple man from Banaras. He marries a returning emigrant, Madhu (Ramya). He is the family-oriented and loyal. She is a daredevil, happy-go-lucky type. He represents the Indian values. She does not mind taking a dive in the village pond in a bikini. One day it's her birthday party and she starts drinking and dancing. Gopi feels ashamed about his wife being like that. He is angered and slaps her. He recognises his error, but she ran away. She wants to live abroad. He wants to stay with his mother in his village. She walks out on him. Mother wants the daughter-in-law back. He decides to get the bride back, but after teaching her a lesson. He goes to Singapore and other foreign locales to hunt for his runaway bride. They occasionally encounter each other. He makes her pregnant and prevents the doctor from aborting the child. She delivers a baby boy. In the meanwhile, he becomes rich and famous. He leaves with the 15-days-old kid and returns to his village and threatens to remarry. The stage is set for his remarriage, but she reappears and wants the child back. He says if she cannot live without her 15-days-old child, then why did she want to separate his mother from her child? She realises her mistake.

Cast
Govinda as Gopi
Ramya as Madhubala “Madhu” Chaubey 
Bindu as Lily Chaubey
Kader Khan as Chaubey
Shakti Kapoor as Gopi's friend
Reema Lagoo as Gopi's mother
Aasif Sheikh as Vikram “Vicky”
Shagufta Ali as Manorama
Upasana Singh as Sheila (Vikram's sister)

Soundtrack

Anand–Milind and Sameer (lyricist) teamed up with producer Nandu Tolani, actor Govinda and director David Dhawan after their previous musical success Raja Babu, but they failed to recreate the success of the former.

References

External links 
 

1997 films
1990s Hindi-language films
Films scored by Anand–Milind
Films directed by David Dhawan
Indian comedy-drama films
Hindi remakes of Tamil films
Films shot in Nepal
1997 comedy-drama films
Films shot in Kathmandu